Boosey is a locality in the Shire of Moira. It has a family-owned cheese company called 'Boosey Creek Cheese' that sells many cheeses including their own which are named after localities in the area. Boosey post office opened on 1 August 1882 and was closed on 17 January 1948. Boosey North post office opened on 2 July 1883 and was on 1 July 1893. Burramine West post office was in the locality of Boosey and was opened on 16 October 1878 and was closed on 28 March 1884.

References

Towns in Victoria (Australia)
Shire of Moira